Michel Comte (born 19 February 1954) is a Swiss artist, filmmaker, fashion and portrait photographer. His most recent art project ‘Light’, focuses on the impact of environmental decline through his large-scale installations, paintings, sculptures and multimedia artworks.

Comte started his career as an art restorer, specializing in contemporary artworks such as Andy Warhol and Yves Klein. In 1979, he was discovered by Karl Lagerfeld who gave him his first international assignment for Chloé and later Chanel. He became well-known for his work with Vogue Italia, l'Uomo Vogue, Vanity Fair and Interview over the years and has worked with brands such as Dolce & Gabbana, Gianfranco Ferre, BMW and Ferrari amongst others. He directed and produced his first feature film in 3D, The Girl from Nagasaki - a retelling of the classic opera Madame Butterfly, which premiered at the Sundance Film Festival in 2014.

Away from the high-gloss magazines and his campaigns for luxury brands, Comte kept himself grounded by taking on photo assignments for the International Red Cross (ICRC) in war-ravaged regions like Bosnia, Angola, Rwanda and Somalia. His work with the ICRC contributed to fundraising efforts to build an orthopaedic hospital in Kabul, Afghanistan and helped raise awareness and money for victims of conflict.

A passionate mountain climber and aviator, Comte began investigating climate change as a student and has had the unprecedented opportunity to observe and portray glacial landscapes all over the world.  Two decades ago, Comte decided to wind down most of his activities as a commercial photographer to focus on 'Light', his most recent art project. 'Light' is the study of natural landscapes and explores the impact of environmental changes via sculpture, paintings, installations and photography.

‘Light’ has been exhibited at the La Triennale di Milano (2017), MAXXI in Rome (2017), Urs Meile Galleries (Beijing 2018 and Lucerne 2020) and Dirimart (Turkey) (2019).

Early career
Comte was born on February 19, 1954, in Zürich, Switzerland. His grandfather was a Swiss aviation pioneer Alfred Comte. Comte studied in England and in France, then started his career in contemporary art restoration, specializing in the works of Andy Warhol and Yves Klein. He was interested in photography and when moving to Paris in 1979, he was discovered by Karl Lagerfeld, who gave him first international assignment for the fashion house of Chloe. Comte then started working for such publications as Vogue US, Vogue Italia, Per Lui, Vanity Fair, and fashion houses such as Emanuel Ungaro, Chanel, Giorgio Armani and so on.

Career
Comte produced many portraits including Jeremy Irons, Louise Bourgeois, Mike Tyson, Akira Kurosawa, Sharon Stone, Carla Bruni, Naomi Campbell, Helena Christensen, Miles Davis, Vanessa Paradis. Many of his images are shot for his long-time friend and influencer Franca Sozzani, an editor-in-chief of Vogue Italia. He continues to shoot for Vogue Italia. His advertising projects include Dolce & Gabbana, Nike, Lancôme, Ferrari, Jaguar, Mercedes Benz, BMW, Hennessy, Davidoff, Gianfranco Ferre, Hermes, Trussardi, Pomellato, Celine, Givenchy, Zeiss and so on. He was awarded as Photographer of the year 2000 by PHOTO magazine.

Comte also followed the career of F1 driver Michael Schumacher.

Photo journalism
Comte is involved in and known for his photo-reportage and documentary work. In collaboration with Pomellato and International Committee of the Red Cross, he contributed to the construction of the orthopaedic centre in Kabul. He traveled in conflict areas such as Bosnia, Kosovo, South Sudan, Iraq, Afghanistan and many others.

Film
Comte directed and produced his first feature film in 3D, The Girl from Nagasaki, retelling of the classic opera, Madame Butterfly, in which Puccini's tragic heroine, emerging from the ashes of the atomic bomb, begins her fateful story of obsession for an American pilot.

Books
 Michel Comte. Object Carpet, Achermann, 1996
 Michel Comte: Kontraste/Contrasts, Stern Portfolio Library of Photography, 1998
 Twenty Years 1979-1999: Faces by Michel Comte - Schirmer/Mosel, 1999
 Aiko T. - Steidl, 2000
 People and Places with No Name - Steidl, 2000
 Charlie Chaplin: A Photo Diary - Steidl, 2002
 Michael Schumacher: Driving Force - Ebury, 2003
 Michael by Michel (Michael Schumacher by Michel Comte) - Steidl, 2003
 The Face of Pace: Scuderia Ferrari - 2006
 Michel Comte on Women - I-Management, 2006
 Michel Comte: The Classics - I-Management, 2007
 Badenfahrt - Ed. Zimmermann, 2007
 Tibet, Zimmermann, 2007
 791: Michel Comte on Michael Schumacher - Ed. Zimmermann, 2007
 Speed! Michel Comte on Michael Schumacher La Scuderia Ferrari, 2007
 Michel Comte - 360° - NRW Forum Kultur und Wirtschaft/Museum fur Gestaltung, 2008
 Michel Comte - Thirty Years and Five Minutes - teNeues, 2009
 Michel Comte, Crescendo Fotografico, curated by Walter Keller, Carlo Cambi Editore, 2010
 Michel Comte: Not Only Women, Feminine Icons of Our Times - Silvana Editoriale, 2011
 The Little Girl from Nagasaki, A Film by Michel Comte, 2014
 Michel Comte and MILK. A collaboration - Damiani, 2015
 Light, Michel Comte, Steidl, 2017
 Aviator, Michael Comte, Steidl, 2020

Exhibitions
 Peggy Guggenheim, Venice 1995 
 Wanderausstellung, Germany 2001 
 Centro Internazionale di Fotografia, Verona 2002 
 He Xiang Ning Art Museum, Shenzhen, 2005 
 The Face of Pace. La Scuderia Ferrari. Michel Comte, Pinakothek der Moderne, Munich 2006 
 Michel Comte on Women, Hotel Suvretta House, St Moritz, 2006 
 Pobeda Gallery, Moscow 2007 
 Espace de l’art contemporain, Mouans-Sartoux 2008 
 NRW-Forum, Düsseldorf 2009 
 Young Gallery, Brussels 2009 
 Museum fur Gestaltung, Zurich 2009 
 Not Only Women, Lu.C.C.A. Center of Contemporary Arts, Lucca 2010 
 Crescendo Fotografico, Triennale di Milano, Milan 2011
 Grand Palais, Paris, 2011
 Contemporary Istanbul, Istanbul, 2012
 Au Premier, HB, Zurich, 2013
 Kunst Haus, Vienna, 2013
 Galerie XXI, Geneva, 2015
 MILK, New York, 2015
 Michel Comte Neoclassic, Palazzo del Governatore, Parma, 2016
 Michel Comte. Light, MAXXI, Rome, 2017
 Michel Comte Black Light, White Light, Triennale di Milano, Milan, 2017
 Light III, Galerie Urs Meile, Beijing 2018
 Erosion, Galerie Urs Meile, Lucerne 2020

References

External links
 Michel Comte Official Website
 Michel Comte Estate Official Website
 
 Steidl Artist Page: Michele Comte

Portrait photographers
Fashion photographers
Commercial photographers
Swiss film directors
1954 births
Living people
Artists from Zürich
Swiss-German people
Swiss photographers
Swiss contemporary artists